The Cordillera autonomy movement in the Philippines refers to the campaign for greater autonomy for the Cordilleras.

The 1986 Constitution allows for the establishment of two autonomous regions in the country; Muslim Mindanao and in the Cordilleras. Two plebiscites (1990 and 1998) were conducted in the Cordillera to legalize the autonomous status of the area where majority of the voters rejected autonomy. The area is currently under the jurisdiction of the Cordillera Administrative Region.

There are still efforts from some local sectors to establish an autonomous region in the Cordillera.

Background

During the Spanish colonial era, the Spaniards referred to the inhabitants of the Cordilleras as the Ygorrottes or the Igorots while the Americans starting 1908 have governed the area as part of a single locality called as the Mountain Province. People from outside the region, or the lowlanders as they are known in the Cordillera, often referred all ethnic people in the area under the single label, Igorot. Unlike the people in the southern Philippines, the Moro who organized themselves in large polities such as sultanates, the Cordilleran people had independent tribes governed by tribal councils. These are among the facts use to argue for a pan-Cordillera identity.

Cordillera conflict
There is a movement for self-determination among the people of the Cordilleras in Luzon, however there were no secessionists in the region calling for the independence of the Cordilleras from the Philippines. The armed Cordillera struggle was derived from the communist rebellion in the Philippines during the regime of President Ferdinand Marcos. The Communist Party of the Philippines and the New People's Army's goal was to overthrow the Marcos, fight what they perceive as imperialism of the United States, after which they plan to establish a people's democratic  republic. The affiliate of the National Democratic Front, the Cordillera People's Democratic Front aimed for the "liberation" of the country along with the Cordilleras from these twin challenges according to its 1981 eight-point general program.

The Cordillera People’s Liberation Army, a group which separated from the NPA in 1986, along with the Montanosa National Solidarity and the Cordillera Bodong Administration fought for greater autonomy in the Cordillera and against what it perceive as internal colonialism by the Philippine central government. The CPLA advocated utilization and stewardship of lands by communes as opposed to private proprietorship and the direct democracy through village assemblies and council of elders. It also promoted the bodong system as a "supra-tribal expression" of the "spirit of social cooperation". They also proposed the conversion of the country into a federal republic as an alternative with each state having co-equal status.

On September 13, 1986 the CPLA and the Government of the Philippines made a "sipat" or cessation of hostilities in Mt. Data Hotel, in Bauko, Mountain Province. The agreement between the two entities were dubbed as the 1986 Mount Data Peace Accord. Furthermore, the Manabo pagta or covenant was signed on December 1, 1986 in Manabo, Abra by local tribal elders. The 1987 Philippine Constitution included the prospect of autonomy for the Cordillera region.

Establishment of the Cordillera Administrative Region

The Mount Data Peace Accord and the Manabo Pagta led to the establishment of the Cordillera Administrative Region through the issuance of Executive Order 220 on July 15, 1987, by then President Corazon C. Aquino with the intention of converting the region to an autonomous one. The provinces of Abra, Benguet and Mountain Province (of the Ilocos Region), and Ifugao and Kalinga-Apayao (of Cagayan Valley) were annexed as part of the newly created region.

Several attempts at legalizing autonomy in the Cordillera region have failed in two separate plebiscites. An affirmative vote for the law on regional autonomy is a precondition by the 1987 Philippine Constitution to give the region autonomy in self-governance much like the Autonomous Region in Muslim Mindanao in southern Philippines. The first law, Republic Act No. 6766, took effect on October 23, 1989, but failed to muster a majority vote in the plebiscite on January 30, 1990. The second law, Republic Act No. 8438 passed by Congress of the Philippines on December 22, 1997, also failed to pass the approval of the Cordillera peoples in a region-wide referendum on March 7, 1998. Political analysts have stated that "people’s lack of  understanding of the autonomy issue, compounded  by misinformation drives by some sectors", was the primary factor against Cordillera autonomy.

Continued campaign for Cordillera autonomy
A closure agreement between the CPLA and the Government of the Philippines was signed on July 4, 2011 at the Rizal Hall in Malacañan Palace. The agreement calls for the disarmament of the group, the reintegration of the militants into mainstream society and the conversion of the militant group into a socio-economic organization. While the group has stopped armed confrontation, the CPLA remain extant as of 2013 still campaigning for greater autonomy in the Cordilleras with about 1,000 members.

There are efforts to make a third bid to legalize autonomy in the Cordillera. Bills to establish an Organic Act for an autonomous region in Cordillera include House Bill No. 5595 filed during the 15th Congress and House Bill No. 4649 filed during the 16th Congress, both of which failed to pass. In the 17th Congress, House Bill No. 5343, "An Act Establishing the Autonomous Region of the Cordillera (ARC)" was filed on March 20, 2017 during its first regular session and was supported by all House representatives from the Cordilleras. It was also the first time in history that all provincial and city governments throughout the Cordilleras supported Cordilleran autonomy. Currently, there are three pending Cordillera autonomy bills in the 18th Congress, House Bill No. 5687 filed by all Cordillera Congressmen, Senate Bill No. 1232 filed by Senator Juan Miguel Zubiri and House Bill No. 7778 filed by Benguet legislative caretaker Eric Yap of ACT-CIS Partylist.

A declaration to expressed support for the establishment of the Autonomous Region of the Cordillera (ARC) as part of the President Rodrigo Duterte-led process of shifting the form of governance of the Philippines to federalism from the presidential setup to federalism was signed on April 24, 2017 by about 200 local officials, tribal leaders, and civil society organizations at Mount Datu. There has also been a campaign to include Nueva Vizcaya into the Cordilleras as the province is culturally and geographically part of the Cordilleras and not the Cagayan Valley.

See also
Autonomous regions of the Philippines
Autonomous Region in Muslim Mindanao
Bangsamoro
Federalism in the Philippines

References

Autonomy
History of the Cordillera Administrative Region
Politics of the Cordillera Administrative Region
Indigenous politics
Separatism in the Philippines
Proposed provinces and territories of the Philippines
Igorot